The 1977 Michigan Wolverines football team was an American football team that represented the University of Michigan in the 1977 Big Ten Conference football season. In its ninth year under head coach Bo Schembechler, the team compiled a 10–2 record, tied with Ohio State for the Big Ten Conference championship, and outscored opponents by a total of 353 to 124.  The Wolverines were ranked No. 1 in the AP Poll midway through the season but were upset by the unranked Minnesota Golden Gophers. In the final game of the regular season, Michigan beat No. 4 Ohio State but lost to No. 13 Washington in the 1978 Rose Bowl. In the final AP and UPI polls, Michigan was ranked No. 9 and No. 8, respectively.

The team's statistical leaders included quarterback Rick Leach with 1,109 passing yards, fullback Russell Davis with 1,013 rushing yards, wing back Ralph Clayton with 393 receiving yards, and placekicker Gregg Willner with 49 points scored. Davis was selected as the team's most valuable player.

On defense, linebacker Ron Simpkins broke Michigan's single-season record with 158 total tackles (113 solo and 45 assists) during the regular season. He also sacked opposing quarterbacks 10 times and recovered five fumbles in 1977. In the final regular season game of the 1977 season, Simpkins had 20 tackles (15 solo) and recovered a fumble that set up the game-winning touchdown in Michigan's 14-6 victory over Ohio State.

Three Michigan players received first-team honors on the 1977 All-America team: (1) offensive guard Mark Donahue (unanimous); (2) center Walt Downing; and (3) linebacker and punter John Anderson. Fourteen Wolverines received first- or second-team honors on the 1977 All-Big Ten Conference football team.

Schedule

Season summary

Pre-season
The 1976 Michigan Wolverines football team compiled a 10–2 record and was ranked No. 3 in the final AP and UPI polls. Michigan lost several starters from the 1976 team, including running back Rob Lytle, who finished third in the 1976 Heisman voting, flanker Jim Smith, and middle linebacker Calvin O'Neal, a consensus first-team All-American.  In the spring of 1977, coach Schembechler publicly questioned whether the 1977 team could be as good as the 1976 team: "How many other teams lost 75 percent of the offense and seven of their 11 defensive starters?" His comment about 75 percent of the offense referred to Rob Lytle and Jim Smith who had a combined total of more than 2,400 rushing and receiving yards.

Key veterans returning from the 1976 team included quarterback Rick Leach and defensive end John Anderson (moved to linebacker in 1977). Another strength was an all-senior offensive line, including guards Mark Donahue and Gerry Szara, center Walt Downing, and tackles Mike Kenn and Bill Dufek. In August 1977, Coach Schembechler paraded the five linemen in front of the press and boasted: "That is probably the best interior line we've had since I've been here. They're all big, they can move and they're smart. They can make adjustments." Dufek sustained a cracked fibula before the season started and was replaced by Jon Giesler.

The 1977 season also saw major changes in the coaching staff. In December 1976, defensive coordinator Gary Moeller was hired as the head coach at Illinois. Less than two weeks later, offensive coordinator and offensive backfield coach Chuck Stobart was hired as head coach at Toledo. Bill McCartney was promoted to take over Moeller's role as defensive coordinator, and Bowling Green head coach Don Nehlen was hired to replace Stobart as the offensive backfield coach.

The 1977 recruiting class included Kurt Becker, Andy Cannavino, B. J. Dickey,  Stan Edwards, and Mike Trgovac.

Illinois

    
    
    
    
    
    
    
    

On September 10, 1977, Michigan, ranked No. 2 in the AP Poll, defeated Illinois, 37-9, at Memorial Stadium in Champaign, Illinois, in a game matching Michigan coach Bo Schembechler against his former defensive coordinator, Gary Moeller. Moeller left Michigan to become Illinois' head coach in 1977.  The game attracted a crowd of 60,477, the largest opening day crowd in Illinois school history.

Michigan dominated the Illini, rushing for 350 yards. Junior quarterback Rick Leach ran an option offense in which he kept the ball for 78 rushing yards and also completed six of 11 passes for 76 yards, including touchdown passes of 30 yards to Ralph Clayton and 11 yards to Gene Johnson.  Running back Harlan Huckleby rushed for 128 yards and two touchdowns on 24 carries. Russell Davis added 99 yards and a touchdown on 18 carries. However, the Wolverines turned the ball over four times: a fumble by Huckleby on Michigan's first play from scrimmage, a fumbled punt return by Roosevelt Smith, and interceptions by Leach and backup quarterback John Wangler. The two fumbles set up the two Illini scores.

On defense, Michigan allowing only 48 passing yards and 59 rushing yards on 38 attempts. Defensive back Mike Jolly had both an interception and a fumble recovery.

Duke

    
    
    
    
    

On September 17, 1977, Michigan (ranked #1 in the AP Poll) defeated Duke, 21-9, in front of a crowd of 104,072 at Michigan Stadium. On the opening kickoff, Harlan Huckleby stepped across the goal line to the one-yard line, then stepped back, with the ball being marked down at the one-yard line.  From there, Michigan was penalized for being offside and then for delay of game.  Michigan did not score in the first quarter, but then scored two touchdowns in the second quarter. Rick Leach rushed for 99 yards and two touchdowns and complete six of 11 passes for 76 yards. Russell Davis also rushed for 95 yards and a touchdown.

Navy

    
    
    

On September 24, 1977, Michigan defeated Navy, 14-7, at Michigan Stadium.  Michigan's points were all scored in the second quarter on runs of 13 and 34 yards by running back Harlan Huckleby. Huckleby rushed for 147 yards, and Russell Davis added 93 more, but Navy outgained Michigan by 301 total yards to 277 total yards. Michigan had defeated Navy by 56 points in 1976, and the seven-point victory in 1977 was considered a disappointment. After the game, Michigan dropped from #1 to #3 in the AP and Coaches' Polls.

Texas A&M

    
    
    
    
    
    
    

On October 1, 1977, No. 3 Michigan defeated No. 5 Texas A&M, 41-3, in front of 104,802 spectators at Michigan Stadium.  Russell Davis rushed for 110 yards and two touchdowns, and Harlan Huckleby added 73 yards and a touchdown.  Rick Leach also threw a 35-yard touchdown pass to Curt Stephenson.  On defense, Ron Simpkins had 14 tackles, recovered a fumble, and blocked a punt that Jim Pickens recovered in the end zone for a touchdown. Mike Jolly also returned an interception 50 yards for a touchdown.  After "skimpy victories" over Duke and Navy, the trouncing of the highly rated Aggies was considered "one of [Michigan's] most stunning performances in recent years.  Columnist Joe Falls wrote: "It may have been Bo Schembechler's finest coaching job in his nine years at Michigan." Texas A&M coach Emory Bellard said, "Michigan came out in the second half and beat us every way you can beat a football team. . . . Michigan is an outstanding team."

Michigan State

    
    
    
    
    
    

On October 8, 1977, Michigan defeated Michigan State, 24-14, at Spartan Stadium.  Michigan State took a 7-0 lead on a 19-yard touchdown pass from Ed Smith to Kirk Gibson. Michigan responded with a 12-yard touchdown pass from Rick Leach to White and a 50-yard field goal to take a 10-7 lead at halftime. Michigan extended its lead to 24-7 in the third quarter on touchdown runs by Russell Davis and Ed Leach.  Harlan Huckleby rushed for 146 yards, and Russell Davis added 96 yards. Ralph Clayton caught three passes for 99 yards. Michigan completed four of 10 passes in the game and threw only one pass in the second half.

Wisconsin

    
    
    
    
    
    
    
    

On October 15, 1977, #1 Michigan defeated undefeated and #14 Wisconsin, 56-0, in front of 104,892 spectators at Michigan Stadium. Rick Leach rushed for 32 yards and a touchdown and completed 10 of 16 passes for 127 yards and touchdown passes to Doug Marsh and Gene Johnson. Roosevelt Smith rushed for 157 yards and two touchdowns, and Russell Davis rushed for 105 yards and a touchdown.  Stanley Edwards and B. J. Dickey also scored rushing touchdowns. After the game, Michigan coach Bo Schembechler said, "We played this one as a big game and it turned out that way."

Minnesota

    
    
    
    

On October 22, 1977, #1 Michigan lost to unranked Minnesota, 16-0, at Memorial Stadium, Minneapolis.  All 16 of Minnesota points were scored by Paul Rogind (three field goals and an extra point) and Marion Barber, Jr. (three-yard touchdown run).  Both Rogind and Barber were from the State of Michigan—Rogind from Farmington, Michigan and Barber from Detroit. Michigan's offense was shut out for the first time in 112 games dating back to 1967. After the game, Minnesota's players swarmed across the field to reclaim the Little Brown Jug trophy that had been in Michigan's custody for a decade. After the game the Detroit Free Press wrote: "In one fell swoop, Minnesota took away Michigan's No. 1 rating, its undefeated season, and, oh yes, that little chunk of pottery known as the Little Brown Jug."

Iowa

    
    
    
    
    

On October 29, 1977, Michigan, ranked #6 after losing to Minnesota, defeated Iowa, 23–6, before a crowd of 104,617 at the annual homecoming game at Michigan Stadium. Rick Leach completed nine of 12 passes for 202 yards, including touchdown passes covering 63 yards to Russell Davis, six yards to Gene Johnson, and 32 yards to Rick White. Leach's three touchdown passes gave him 25 for his career, breaking the record of 23 set by Bob Chappuis in the 1940s. Michigan also scored on a safety in the fourth quarter when linebacker Dom Tedesco tackled Iowa's quarterback in the end zone. After the game, Bo Schembechler said, "That was a devastating defeat a week ago. No one will ever know how hard it was to come back from that game."

Northwestern

    
    
    
    
    
    
    
    
    
    
    
    

On November 5, 1977, Michigan defeated Northwestern, 63-20, at Michigan Stadium. In the lopsided victory, 77 Michigan players had an opportunity to play in the game. Rick Leach ran for two touchdowns, passed for two more (one to Stanley Edwards, the other to Ralph Clayton), and set a new Michigan's record with 2,664 career passing yards. Late in the game, John Wangler threw a touchdown pass to Alan Mitchell. Michigan totaled 511 yards of total offense.

Purdue

    
    
    
    
    
    
    
    

On November 12, 1977, Michigan defeated Purdue, 40–7, before a crowd of 68,003 at Ross–Ade Stadium in West Lafayette, Indiana. One year earlier, Purdue had upset Michigan by a 16–14 score, knocking Michigan out of the No. 1 ranking. Adding to the anticipation, the game matched coach Schembechler against his longtime defensive coordinator, Jim Young, who took over as Purdue's head coach in 1977.

Purdue's freshman quarterback Mark Herrmann led the Boilermakers on a 55-yard, seven-play opening drive capped by a six-yard touchdown pass to Dave Young. Defensive back Dwight Hicks set up Michigan's first score when he intercepted Hermann's pass at Purdue's 18-yard line with five minutes remaining in the first quarter. Michigan settled for a field goal, and Purdue held a 7-3 lead at the end of the first quarter.  In the second quarter, Michigan quarterback Rick Leach led the Wolverines on a 60-yard, eight-minute drive capped by an eight-yard touchdown pass to Mark Schmerge.  With less than a minute remaining in the second quarter, Michigan forced a fumble on a punt, which was recovered by Curt Stephenson at the two-yard line. Roosevelt Smith scored on the next play, and Michigan took a 17-7 lead at halftime.

Michigan back Russell Davis, playing in place of an injured Harlan Huckleby, rushed for 127 yards in the third quarter (168 in the game), including a 24-yard touchdown run. Michigan extended its lead to 31-7 when Dom Tedesco intercepted a Hermann pass and returned it for a touchdown. With 50 seconds left in the third quarter, Michigan scored again on a second touchdown pass from Leach to Schmerge. Michigan concluded the scoring in the fourth quarter when Tom Seabron sacked Hermann in the end zone for a safety.

After Purdue's opening drive, Michigan's defense held Purdue scoreless for the remainder of the game. Linebacker Ron Simpkins led the defense with 10 tackles, and the Wolverines also limited Hermann to 74 passing yards with three interceptions.

Ohio State

    
    
    
    

On November 19, 1977, Michigan, ranked No. 5 in both polls, defeated No. 4 Ohio State, 14–6, at Michigan Stadium. The game was broadcast to a national television audience on ABC, and the crowd of 106,024 at the stadium was the largest ever to attend a regular-season college football game.  The opening minutes were preempted by the arrival of Egyptian President Anwar Sadat on his historic visit to Israel, causing an angry reaction in Ann Arbor bars where hundreds had gathered to watch the game.

For the second consecutive year, Michigan's defense prevented Ohio State from scoring a touchdown. Ohio State had the momentum in the first quarter, taking a 3–0 lead on a Vlade Janakievski field goal and limiting Michigan to five plays and five yards. A second Janakievski field goal attempt in the opening quarter went wide to the right. In the second quarter, quarterback Rick Leach led the Wolverines on a 50-yard drive, but a 42-yard field goal attempt by Gregg Willner fell short. On the next possession, Leach again led the Wolverines down the field, and this time the drive ended with a one-yard touchdown run by Roosevelt Smith.  Michigan led, 7–3, at halftime.

In the third quarter, Michigan linebacker Ron Simpkins recovered a Ron Springs fumble at Ohio State's 20-yard line. Leach then scored on a two-yard run. Willner converted the extra point kick, and Michigan led, 14–3. On the next drive, Ohio State quarterback Rod Gerald led a 74-yard drive to Michigan's 11-yard line, but the Buckeyes lost yardage on the next three plays, including a sack by Simpkins. Ohio State settled for a field goal by Janakievski. Ohio State moved deep into Michigan territory on two additional drives. On the first, the defense stopped Ohio State fullback Paul Campbell on a fourth-and-one run at the 10-yard line.  On the other, Ohio State drove more than 90 yards and had a first down at Michigan's eight-yard line. On the next play, Gerald was hit in the backfield by linebacker John Anderson and fumbled, with Derek Howard recovering the ball for Michigan.

In a battle of two great defenses, Ohio State out-gained Michigan by 352 yards to 196. Michigan managed only 10 first downs to 23 for Ohio State. After the game, coach Schembechler praised his defense: "Our defense was terrific. They came up with big plays when we had to have them." Ohio State coach Woody Hayes said: "This is by far the best game we ever played and lost. Their defense should receive great, great credit, for they stopped us when we were in scoring position."

The game was marred by controversy when 64-year-old coach Hayes punched ABC's sideline cameraman in the stomach. Hayes was angered when the cameraman focused on Hayes after his quarterback's fourth quarter fumble. Asked about the incident in a post-game press conference, Hayes "went into a mini-rage", balled his fist in front of the reporter and said: "They stick it in your face every damn time." Two days later, Hayes apologized for the incident, but at the same time called the cameraman "a liar" and said he was "so damned tired of hearing what I did to that man out there."

Rose Bowl

    
    
    
    
    
    
    
    

On January 2, 1978, Michigan lost to Washington, 27–20, in the 1978 Rose Bowl. Michigan entered the game ranked No. 4 by the AP and favored by two touchdowns against No. 13 Washington. With the loss, Michigan coach Schembechler had a record of 0-8-1 in the final games of his nine seasons at Michigan.

Washington dominated early, taking a 17–0 lead at halftime. Washington quarterback Warren Moon scored on two rushing touchdowns, and Steve Robbins kicked a 30-yard field goal. Washington was aided in the first quarter when Michigan punter John Anderson dropped to one knee to field an errant snap, giving Washington excellent field position. In another first half mishap, Michigan drove to Washington's 31-yard line but turned the ball over on a Russell Davis fumble. With two minutes remaining the first half, Washington coach Don James called for a fake punt on fourth-and-seven from the Huskies' 33-yard line. Washington's freshman punter Aaron Wilson completed a pass from punt formation that resulted in a 46-yard gain.

At the start of the third quarter, Michigan's Mike Jolly intercepted a Moon pass deep in Washington territory. On fourth down inside the five-yard line, Roosevelt Smith's run was stopped short of the line to gain. After the goal-line stand, Moon led the Huskies on a 97-yard touchdown drive ending with a 28-yard touchdown pass from Moon to Spider Gaines. The Huskies led, 24–0.

In the final 20 minutes of the game, Michigan turned to a passing game and scored three touchdowns. With less than five minutes remaining in the third quarter, Rick Leach threw 23 yards to Curt Stephenson who ran untouched the remaining 53 yards into the end zone. Leach's 76-yard completion to Stephenson was the longest pass play in Rose bowl history to that point. Michigan next scored on touchdown runs by Russell Davis and Stan Edwards.  

With 95 seconds left in the game, Michigan had the ball at Washington's 19-yard line when Ralph Clayton dropped Leach's pass in the end zone. Leach then hit Stan Edwards with a pass at the six-yard line, but the ball bounced off Edwards' hands and helmet and was intercepted by Washington linebacker Michael Jackson. Michigan's defense then held on three plays and forced Washington to punt from its end zone. On the final drive of the game, Leach threw into the end zone again, but the pass was intercepted by Washington back Nesby Glasgow.

Award season
Five Michigan players received honors on the 1977 All-America team:
 Offensive tackle Mark Donahue was a unanimous selection, receiving first-team honors from the American Football Coaches Association, the Associated Press, the Football Writers Association of America, the United Press International, Football News, the Newspaper Enterprise Association, The Sporting News, and the Walter Camp Football Foundation.
 Center Walt Downing received first-team honors from the American Football Coaches Association, Football News, and The Sporting News, and second-team honors from the Newspaper Enterprise Association. 
 Linebacker John Anderson received first-team honors from the Football Writers Association of America and second-team honors from the United Press International.
 Offensive tackle Mike Kenn received second-team honors from the Associated Press.
 Defensive back Dwight Hicks also received second-team honors from the Associated Press.

Fourteen Michigan players received recognition from the Associated Press (selected by sports writers and broadcasters) and/or United Press International (selected by the Big Ten coaches) on the 1977 All-Big Ten Conference football team: Mark Donahue at guard (AP-1, UPI-1), Dwight Hicks at defensive back (AP-1, UPI-1), Rick Leach at quarterback (AP-1, UPI-2), Mike Kenn at offensive tackle (AP-1, UPI-2), Walt Downing at center (AP-1), John Anderson at defensive end (AP-2, UPI-1) and punter (AP-2, UPI-2), Ron Simpkins at linebacker (AP-2, UPI-1), Jim Pickens at defensive back (AP-2, UPI-1), Russell Davis at running back (AP-2, UPI-2), Harlan Huckleby at running back (UPI-2), Steve Graves at middle guard (UPI-2), Derek Howard at defensive back (UPI-2), Gene Johnson at tight end (AP-2), and Dom Tedesco at linebacker (AP-2).

Team awards were presented as follows:
Most Valuable Player: Russell Davis
Meyer Morton Award: John Anderson
Frederick Matthei Award: Jerry Meter
Arthur Robinson Scholarship Award: John Anderson
John Maulbetsch Award: Ron Simpkins

Personnel

Full roster

Offense
John Arbeznik, offensive guard, junior, University Heights, Ohio - started 1 game at right offensive guard
Greg Bartnick, offensive guard, junior, Detroit, Michigan - started 2 games at right offensive guard
Kurt Becker, offensive tackle, freshman, Aurora, Illinois
Roger Bettis, quarterback, senior, Minerva, Ohio
Jim Breaugh, quarterback, freshman, West Bloomfield, M wing back, sophomore, Detroit, Michigan - started 8 games at wing back
Ralph Clayton,wing back, sophomore, Detroit - started eight games at wing back
Russell Davis, fullback, junior, Woodbridge, Virginia - started all 12 games at fullback
B. J. Dickey, quarterback, freshman, Ottawa, Ohio
Gerald Diggs, tailback, sophomore, Chicago, Illinois
Mark Donahue, offensive guard, senior, Oak Lawn, Illinois - started all 12 games at left offensive guard
Walt Downing, center, senior, Coatesville, Pennsylvania - started all 12 games at center
Bill Dufek, offensive tackle, senior, East Grand Rapids, Michigan
Stanley Edwards,tailback, freshman, Detroit, Michigan
Jon Giesler, offensive tackle, junior, Woodville, Ohio - started 1 game at left offensive tackle, 1 game at right offensive tackle
Harlan Huckleby, tailback, junior, Detroit, Michigan - started all 12 games at tailback
Gene Johnson, tight end, junior, Flint, Michigan - started 9 games at tight end
Stacy Johnson, quarterback, junior, Camden, New Jersey
Dave Kadela, offensive tackle, junior, Dearborn, Michigan
Mike Kenn, offensive tackle, senior, Evanston, Illinois - started 11 games at left offensive tackle
Kevin King, fullback, senior, Oak Lawn, Illinois
Rick Leach, quarterback, junior, Flint, Michigan - started all 12 games at quarterback
George Lilja, center, sophomore, Palos Park, Illinois
Doug Marsh, tight end, junior, Akron, Ohio
Alan Mitchell, wide receiver, freshman, Detroit, Michigan
John J. Powers, offensive tackle, sophomore, Oak Park, Illinois - started 10 games at right offensive tackle
Lawrence P. Reid, fullback, sophomore, Philadelphia, Pennsylvania
Max Richardson, wing back, senior, Fort Wayne, Indiana - started 4 games at wing back
Mark Schmerge, tight end, junior, Cincinnati, Ohio - started 1 game at tight end
Mike Smith, tailback, senior, Kalamazoo, Michigan
Rickey Blake, tailback, sophomore, Chicago,Illinois
Curt Stephenson, wide receiver, senior, La Jolla, California 
Gerry Szara, offensive guard, senior, Oak Lawn, Illinois - started 9 games at right guard 
 Richard White, wide receiver, senior, Cincinnati, Ohio - started all 12 games at wide receiver

Defense
John Anderson, defensive end, senior, Waukesha, Wisconsin - started all 12 games at outside linebacker
Gene Bell, wolf, sophomore, East Liverpool, Ohio
Mark Braman, defensive halfback, junior, Midland, Michigan
Woody Brown, safety, senior, East Detroit, Michigan
Andy Cannavino, inside linebacker, freshman, Cleveland, Ohio
Mark DeSantis, outside linebacker, junior, Harper Woods, Michigan
Chris Godfrey, defensive tackle, sophomore, Detroit, Michigan - started 5 games at defensive tackle
Steve Graves, middle guard, senior, Cleveland, Ohio - started all 12 games at middle guard
Curtis Greer, defensive tackle, junior, Detroit, Michigan - started 9 games at defensive tackle
Mike Harden, defensive halfback, sophomore, Detroit, Michigan - started 1 game at weak-side cornerback, 1 game at safety
Dave Harding, ILS, senior, Northville, Michigan
Dwight Hicks, wolf, senior, Pennsauken, New Jersey - started 11 games at wolfman
Robert K. Holloway, outside linebacker, junior, West Bloomfield, Michigan
Derek Howard, wolf, senior, Hamilton, Ohio - started all 12 games (10 at strong-side cornerback, 1 at wolfman, 1 at safety)
William Jackson, defensive tackle, junior, Richmond, Virginia - started 1 game at defensive tackle
Raymond J. Johnson, defensive halfback, senior, Gary, Indiana
Mike Jolly, defensive halfback, sophomore, Melvindale, Michigan - started 11 games at weak-side cornerback
Dale Keitz, defensive tackle, junior, Columbus, Ohio - started 9 games at defensive tackle
Thomas A. Melita, middle guard, junior, Penns Grove, New Jersey
Jerry Meter, inside linebacker, junior, Birmingham, Michigan - started all 12 games at inside linebacker
Mel Owens, inside linebacker, sophomore, DeKalb, Illinois - started 1 game at inside linebacker
Robert M. Patek, wolf, junior, Farmington Hills, Michigan
Jim Pickens, defensive halfback, senior, Sylvania, Ohio - started all 12 games (10 at safety, 2 at strong-side cornerback)
Tom Seabron, outside linebacker, junior, Detroit, Michigan
Ron Simpkins, inside linebacker, sophomore, Detroit, Michigan - started 11 games at inside linebacker
Dominic Tedesco, outside linebacker, senior, Riverside, Illinois - started all 12 games at outside linebacker
Mike Trgovac, middle guard, freshman, Austintown, Ohio

Kickers
Nick Labun, place-kicker, senior, Rockford, Illinois
Bryan Virgil, place-kicker, sophomore, Buchanan, Michigan
Gregg Willner, place-kicker, junior, Miami Beach, Florida

Coaching staff
Head coach: Bo Schembechler
Assistant coaches: 
 Bill McCartney - defensive coordinator
 Dennis Brown - defensive ends coach
 Jack Harbaugh - defensive backs coach
 Tom Reed - defensive line coach
 Jerry Hanlon - offensive line coach
 Paul Schudel - offensive interior line coach
 Tirrel Burton - offensive ends coach
 Don Nehlen - offensive backfield coach
 Graduate assistants - Bob Thornbladh, Barry Pierson, Tim Davis, and Jerry Zuver

Other personnel
Athletic director: Don Canham
Trainer: Lindsy McLean
Manager: Donald G. Di Paolo
 Stadium announcer: Howard King
 Radio play-by-play announcer: Bob Ufer (WJR)

Statistics

Offensive statistics

Rushing

Passing

Receiving

Special teams statistics

Returns

Kicking

References

External links
  1977 Football Team -- Bentley Historical Library, University of Michigan Athletics History

Michigan
Michigan Wolverines football seasons
Big Ten Conference football champion seasons
Michigan Wolverines football